Robert Barrett (born 31 March 1966) is an English actor. He is best known for his role as Dr. Sacha Levy in the BBC1 medical drama Holby City. He played a barrister, Mr Levi, in an episode of the TV series Bad Girls .

Career
Barrett was educated at Bedford School, where he was a boarder, he then trained at the Guildhall School of Music and Drama in London. He is best known for his role as Dr. Sacha Levy in the BBC One medical drama Holby City.

His extensive stage career began in 1991, and he has over thirty credits to his name in the West End and around the UK. In 2008 he appeared as Malvolio in the Propeller production of Twelfth Night at the Old Vic in London. In March 2012, he appeared in Modestep's video "Show Me A Sign" as "The Boss".

Barrett is married to the actress Rebecca Charles with whom he has two daughters (born 1997 and 2001).

Performances

Film

Television

Following the axe of BBC Holby City in 2022 it was announced that Bob Barrett would return as Sacha Levy for one episode of Casualty in 2023.

Stage

See also

External links

References

1966 births
Living people
20th-century English male actors
21st-century English male actors
Alumni of the Guildhall School of Music and Drama
English male film actors
English male stage actors
English male television actors
People educated at Bedford School